Andrew Butters (born 15 April 1965) is a South African cricketer. He played in six first-class matches for Eastern Province in 1984/85 and 1985/86.

See also
 List of Eastern Province representative cricketers

References

External links
 

1965 births
Living people
South African cricketers
Eastern Province cricketers
Cricketers from Port Elizabeth